Rohan is a name originating in Sanskrit. "Rohan" has multiple origins such as in Persian, Indian, Irish, Japanese, and Gaelic. Rohan can be both a given name and a surname. In Persian, it means good character and pious, In Sanskrit, it means "Ascending" as well as another name of Sri Vishnu. In Arabic, it means "spiritual". In Gaelic, Rohan has a variant of its name, Rowan. In Japanese, it means "accompanying dew". In Hindi and Urdu, it means "ascent".

The later European surname is derived from Rohan, a commune in Brittany.

List
Notable people with the name include:

Given name
 Rohan Amerasekera (1916–1974), first native Commander of the Sri Lanka Air Force
 Rohan Banerjee (born 1988), Indian cricketer
 Rohan Bewick (born 1989), Australian rules footballer for the Brisbane Lions
 Rohan Bopanna (born 1980), professional Indian tennis player
 Rohan Campbell (born 1997/1998), Canadian actor
 Rohan Davey (born 1978), Jamaican-born American football quarterback

 Rohan de Saram (born 1939), British-born Sri Lankan cellist
 Rohan Dennis (born 1990), Australian racing cyclist
 Rohan Gavaskar (born 1976), Indian former cricketer
 Rohan Gunaratna (born 1961), terrorism expert
 Rohan Jayasekera (cricketer) (born 1957), former cricketer who represented Sri Lanka and Canada
 Rohan Jayasekera (writer) (born 1961), Associate Editor of Index on Censorship
 Rohan Kanhai (born 1935) Guyanese former cricketer
 Rohan Marley (born 1972), businessman, Bob Marley's son
 Rohan O'Grady (1922–2014), pen name of Canadian novelist June O'Grady (Skinner)
 Rohan Pethiyagoda (born 1955), Sri Lankan taxonomist
 Rohan Ricketts (born 1981), English footballer
 Rohan Sippy, Indian film director
 Rohan Smith (born 1973), Australian rules footballer
 Rohan Suppiah (born 1982), Malaysian cricketer

Surname
 Benjamin de Rohan, duc de Soubise (c. 1580–1642), Huguenot leader
 Charles de Rohan, prince de Soubise (1715–1787), peer and marshal of France
 Denis Michael Rohan (born 1941), Australian who attempted to burn down the al-Aqsa mosque in 1969
 Emmanuel de Rohan-Polduc (1725–1797), Grand Master of the Order of Saint John
 Enda Rohan (born 1929), Irish chess master
 Gary Rohan (born 1991), Australian rules footballer
 Guy Auguste de Rohan-Chabot (1683–1760), also called Chevalier de Rohan, an opponent of Voltaire
 Henri, Duke of Rohan (1579–1638), French soldier, writer and leader of the Huguenots
 Hercule Mériadec, Duke of Rohan-Rohan (1669–1749)
 Jiří Rohan (born 1964), Czechoslovak and Czech slalom canoer
 Louis René Édouard, cardinal de Rohan (1734–1803), prince de Rohan-Guemenée, archbishop of Strasbourg
 Lukáš Rohan (born 1995), Czech slalom canoeist
 Michael Scott Rohan (1951–2018), Scottish fantasy and science fiction author

Fictional Characters
Given name
Rohan Kishibe from JoJo's Bizarre Adventure: Diamond Is Unbreakable
Rohan Kumakura, a minor character from AI: The Somnium Files
Ai Rohan from the h-game ''Let's Kaitou! Nusumi Kei!? Ano no Ko no Nusumikata, Oshiemasu~

See also
 Rowan (name)
House of Rohan

References

Sinhalese masculine given names